The Bill Clinton Boyhood Home, also known as the Birnbaum-Shubetz House, is a historic house at 1011 Park Avenue in Hot Springs, Arkansas.  Built about 1896 and redesigned in the Tudor Revival in 1938, it was the home of United States President Bill Clinton between 1954 and 1961, teenage years in which he first determined to enter politics.  In addition to this national historic significance, it is locally notable as an example of Tudor Revival architecture.  The house is a private residence and is not open to the public.

The house was listed on the National Register of Historic Places in 1995.

See also
National Register of Historic Places listings in Garland County, Arkansas

References

Houses on the National Register of Historic Places in Arkansas
Tudor Revival architecture in the United States
Houses completed in 1896
Buildings and structures in Garland County, Arkansas
Bill Clinton
National Register of Historic Places in Hot Springs, Arkansas